Doan Bui is a French journalist born in Le Mans.

She received the prix Albert-Londres 2013 for her report Les Fantômes du fleuve on migrants trying to penetrate Europe in Greece through Turkey, published by Nouvel Observateur.

In 2016, she was awarded the prix Amerigo Vespucci for her work Le Silence de mon père (Éditions L'Iconoclaste).

Publications 
2002: Milliardaires d'un jour : Splendeurs et misères de la nouvelle économie, with Grégoire Biseau, Paris, Éditions Grasset and Fasquelle, 373 p. 
2009: Les Affameurs : voyage au cœur de la planète de la faim, Paris, 360 p. 
2010: Ils sont devenus français, with Isabelle Monnin, Paris, Éditions JC Lattès, series "Essais et documents", 303 p. 
2011: Pour une terre solidaire, with Jean-Paul Rivière and all, Paris, éditions , 240 p. 
2016: Le Silence de mon père, Paris, L'Iconoclaste, 272 p.

Television 
 2014–2015: , historical TV serial by Rachid Bouchareb and : presentation of zouave Daurière

References

External links 
 Entre le Vietnam et la France : Doan Bui, à la recherche de l'identité heureuse in Marianne (5 June 2016)
 Doan Bui sur les traces de son père : connaît-on jamais quelqu'un? on Europe 1 (13 March 2016)
 Le prix de la porte dorée pour Le silence de mon père de Doan Bui on Actualitté (9 June 2016)
 Entretien avec la lauréate 2016 du Prix littéraire de la Porte Dorée on Le magazine de la Cité (7 June 2016)

21st-century French journalists
French women journalists
Albert Londres Prize recipients
People from Le Mans
1970s births
Living people
21st-century French women